Xico is a restaurant serving Mexican cuisine in Portland, Oregon's Richmond neighborhood, in the United States. The restaurant opened in 2012; sibling establishment Xica Cantina opened in northwest Portland in mid 2019.

Description

Xico is a Mexican restaurant in southeast Portland's Richmond neighborhood. Eater Portland Brooke Jackson-Glidden said the "contemporary" restaurant has a "Pacific Northwestern [take] on Mexican food". Xico's queso has chorizo and salsa verde. The drinking menu features a mezcal collection and a habanero-caramel hot chocolate. As of 2015, the restaurant offered a popular rotisserie chicken dinner for two. Xico began serving lunch in February 2018.

History
Xico opened in 2012 and is owned by Elizabeth Davis, as of 2019. Liz Davis has also been credited as a co-owner, as of 2018. David Haddow was the sous chef, as of 2016. In 2018, the restaurant's executive chef Kelly Myers suffered a stroke. Michael Russell of The Oregonian described how the community rallied behind her. Myers' quelites recipe is featured in the 2018 cookbook Saving Pan, which was compiled by local students to raise money for the Jane Goodall Institute's Tchimpounga Chimpanzee Rehabilitation Center in the Republic of Congo; the book also features a paper collage inspired by Myers.

In June 2019, the LLC behind Xico (Normal Activity) confirmed plans to open sibling restaurant Xica Cantina along Northwest 23rd. Xica Cantina was operating by the end of the month, and held a grand opening on July 5. In 2019,Willamette Week Matthew Singer described Xica as the "casual cousin to Southeast Division Street Mexican favorite Xico". Xico and Xica both offered pickup service during the COVID-19 pandemic, as of May 2020.

Reception
In 2016, Willamette Week Martin Cizmar and Matthew Korfhage ranked Xico winners in the "best overall" and "best margaritas" categories in their overview of the "six most bougie taco spots" in southeast Portland. The newspaper's Beth Slovic wrote, "Xico Will Change How You Think About Mexican Food".  Samantha Bakall of The Oregonian called the restaurant's hot chocolate a "soothing way to finish dinner" in her 2017 overview of the city's "best drinking chocolate". Alex Frane of Eater Portland included Xico is his 2019 list of the city's "most enticing" margaritas.

See also
 Hispanics and Latinos in Portland, Oregon
 List of Mexican restaurants

References

External links

 
 Xico at Zagat

2012 establishments in Oregon
Mexican restaurants in Portland, Oregon
Restaurants established in 2012
Richmond, Portland, Oregon